Broken Barricades is the fifth studio album by English rock band Procol Harum, released the same week they began their U.S. tour, on 3 April 1971. The UK release was on 11 June 1971. It was guitarist Robin Trower's last recording with the group until The Prodigal Stranger (1991).

"Song for a Dreamer" is a tribute to late Jimi Hendrix from Trower, who was stunned by Hendrix's death in September 1970 at the age of 27.

Cover
The cut-out cover was designed by C.C.S. Associates (a leading creative design team in London producing promotional ideas and album cover artwork for A&M, Chrysalis, Charisma, Island and Trojan Records. The primary CCS designers were Harry Isles, John Bonis, and William Neal). Photography was by Peter Sanders.

Images from left to right are: Gary Brooker, Chris Copping, Robin Trower, and B. J. Wilson.

Track listing

Personnel

Procol Harum
 Gary Brooker – piano, vocals (except "Song for a Dreamer" and "Poor Mohammed")
 Robin Trower – guitar, lead vocals on "Song for a Dreamer" and "Poor Mohammed"
 Chris Copping – bass, organ
 B. J. Wilson – drums
Keith Reid – lyrics

Technical personnel
 Chris Thomas – producer
 John Punter – engineer
 C.C.S. Associates – artwork, design
 Pete Sanders – photography

Charts

References

Procol Harum albums
1971 albums
Progressive rock albums by English artists
Chrysalis Records albums
Albums produced by Chris Thomas (record producer)